The 2019 Arnold Strongman Classic was a strongman contest that took place in Ohio, Columbus from 1–2 March 2019 at the Greater Columbus Convention Center. The Arnold Strongman Classic is the finale of the Arnold Strongman Tour and is seen as one of the biggest and most prestigious strongmen events on the circuit.

Defending champion Iceland's Hafþór Júlíus Björnsson won the competition for the second time. American Martins Licis finished 2nd while 
Poland's Mateusz Kieliszkowski came in 3rd.

Qualifying

To qualify for the Arnold Strongman Classic athletes have to either win a sanctioned event on the Arnold Classic Tour or gain enough points to be invited through a wildcard system. Athletes that qualified and their method for qualification are as follows:

Event Results

Event 1: Elephant Bar Deadlift
Time Limit: 60 seconds per lift
Notes: 3 lifts per athlete, weights to be submitted before each round.

^ JF Caron sustained an injury in this event and took no further part in the competition.

^ Brian Shaw sustained an injury in this event however he completed all further events in the competition.

Event 2: Husafell Stone Carry
Weight:  for max distance.
Time Limit: 2 Minutes
Notes: This is not the actual Husafell Stone but a replica produced by Rogue Fitness.

Event 3: Wheel of Pain
Weight:  for max distance.
Time Limit: 60 seconds.

Event 4: Austrian Oak
Weight:  Light log.  Heavy log. For max repetitions.
Time Limit: 90 Seconds
Notes: Repetitions on the heavy log gain more points than repetitions on the light log. * Denote repetitions on the light log.

^ Oleksii Novikov sustained an injury in this event however he completed the remaining event.

Event 5: Stone to Shoulder
Weight:  For max repetitions.
Time Limit: 2 Minutes 30 seconds.
Notes: Athletes were awarded for getting the stone to their lap or torso but not completing the full repetition.

^ Brian Shaw did not take part in this event because of an injury he sustained earlier in the competition.

^ Jerry Pritchett did not take part in this event because of an injury.

Final standings

References 

Arnold Strongman Classic
Arnold Strongman Classic
Arnold Strongman Classic
Strongmen competitions